Giulia Galli is a condensed-matter physicist. She is the Liew Family Professor of Electronic Structure and Simulations in the Pritzker School of Molecular Engineering and the Department of Chemistry at the University of Chicago and senior scientist at Argonne National Laboratory. She is also the director of the Midwest Integrated Center for Computational Materials. She is recognized for her contributions to the fields of computational condensed-matter, materials science, and nanoscience, most notably first principles simulations of materials and liquids, in particular materials for energy, properties of water, and excited state phenomena.

Education
Galli earned her PhD in physics in 1987 from the International School for Advanced Studies in Trieste, Italy. She held postdoctoral fellowships at the University of Illinois at Urbana-Champaign with Richard Martin, and the  IBM Research Division in Zurich, Switzerland.

Career
Galli joined the Swiss Federal Institute of Technology (EPFL) in Lausanne, Switzerland, in 1991 first as senior researcher and then as senior scientist. She moved to Lawrence Livermore National Laboratory in Livermore, California in 1998, where she was the founding group leader of the Quantum Simulations Group that she led until 2005. From 2005 to 2013, Galli was Professor of Chemistry and Physics at University of California, Davis. While at UC Davis, she was the chair of Deep Carbon Observatory's Extreme Physics and Chemistry Directorate. In 2014 she joined the University of Chicago's Institute for Molecular Engineering (now Pritzker School of Molecular Engineering) as Liew Family Professor of Electronic Structure and Simulations. She is also Professor of Chemistry at the University of Chicago and senior scientist at Argonne National Laboratory. She is the director of the Midwest Integrated Center for Computational Materials (MICCoM), which develops and disseminates interoperable open source software, data and validation procedures for the simulation and prediction of functional materials. MICCoM was established by the Department of Energy in 2015 and renewed in 2019.

Research and achievements

Galli's research activity focuses on the development and use of computational methods to understand and predict the behavior of solids, liquids and nanostructures from first principles. Galli pioneered the application of first principles molecular dynamics to heterogeneous materials and liquids and she developed methods for computational spectroscopy, including  electronic and vibrational spectroscopies. Her theoretical studies of excited state properties of matter focus on the prediction of optimal systems for harvesting sunlight and on the properties of water resources at ambient conditions and in severe environments. Another area of active interest  is the study of phenomena and materials used to realize quantum information technologies. Galli's software activities are focused on the development of the WEST code (large-scale electronic structure within many-body perturbation theory) and participation in the development of the Qbox code (ab initio molecular dynamics) led by Francois Gygi at University of California, Davis, both of which are supported by MICCoM.

Honors and awards

Galli is a Fellow of the American Physical Society and the American Association for the Advancement of Science, and a member of the American Academy of Arts and Sciences, the National Academy of Sciences and the International Academy for Quantum Molecular Science; she is the recipient of the Lawrence Livermore National Laboratory Science and Technology Award, the Department of Energy Award of Excellence, the 2018 Materials Research Society Theory Award, the 2019 David Adler Lectureship Award in the Field of Materials Physics, and the 2022 Aneesur Rahman Prize in Computational Physics from the American Physical Society, the 2019 Nelson W. Taylor Award, the 2019 Feynman prize for nanotechnology (theory), and the 2019 Tommasoni-Chisesi prize. In 2022 she 
was named the recipient of the Lifetime Achievement Award by the foundation of Italian Scientists and Scholars in North America (ISSNAF).

References

External links
 
 
 
 
 
 
 

Italian women physicists
21st-century Italian physicists
American women physicists
Date of birth missing (living people)
20th-century American physicists
21st-century American women scientists
Living people
University of Chicago faculty
20th-century American women scientists
Fellows of the American Physical Society
Fellows of the American Association for the Advancement of Science
Fellows of the American Academy of Arts and Sciences
Members of the United States National Academy of Sciences
Scientific computing researchers
Year of birth missing (living people)
American women academics